Graham School is a coeducational secondary school in the west of Scarborough in North Yorkshire, England. It is situated to the west of the town within  of grounds. The school is on Woodlands Drive. The lower site on Lady Edith's Drive closed on 23 June 2017.

Graham School provides for pupils aged 11 to 16 (year 7 to year 11)

History
The school is named after Mr C C Graham, Mayor of Scarborough between 1913 and 1919.

Grammar school
Prior to 1973, the buildings were used by Scarborough High School for Boys, a boys' grammar school. The present building designed by Keith Scott of Building Design Partnership's Preston office, was built by the North Riding Education Committee in the late 1950s, around the same time as Scarborough Technical College (now called Yorkshire Coast College). It had around 700 boys in the early 1970s.

Comprehensive
Only the first year was all-ability when it opened. Gradually over four years from 1973 it became a comprehensive. The former site of the Scarborough Girls' High School on Sandybed Lane, further to the south, became Scarborough Sixth Form College, although the girls aged under 16 from the school joined the Graham School, with boys from the other grammar school. For the first three years, it was mostly a mixed grammar school than a comprehensive.

In 1975 it took over the former Convent of Our Ladies of Mary High School for Girls, and these buildings became the lower school until 1984. The school at this time had specialist nautical studies courses, which were aimed at pupils wishing to pursue a career at sea.

It gained specialist Science College status in 2004. In 2009 it entered into a federation with Raincliffe School, a nearby secondary school. The Raincliffe School site, (now lower) Graham School, closed on 23 June 2017.

Academy
Previously a community school administered by North Yorkshire County Council, in March 2019 Graham School converted to academy status. The school is now sponsored by the Hope Learning Trust.

Notable former teachers
Jack Ellis, Rugby Union player (boys' high school)
 Jimmy Johnson Labour MP from 1950 to 1959 for Rugby, and from 1964 to 1983 for Kingston upon Hull West (taught geography from 1934 to 1944 at the boys' high school)

Notable former pupils

Scarborough High School for Boys
 Ray Bloom, cricketer, for Yorkshire
 Richard Caton CBE, crucial in the discovery of Alpha wave activity in the human brain
John Wyrill Christian, metallurgist, and Professor of Physical Metallurgy from 1967 to 1988 at the University of Oxford
 Clive Clark, golfer and commentator
Fred Feast, actor, most notably in Coronation Street
Bill Foord, cricketer, for Yorkshire
Gilbert Gray QC, barrister & Recorder 1972-1998, at the Old Bailey
Robert Tinsley Holtby
Geoff Hoyle, actor and entertainer
John David Kennedy, Professor of Inorganic Chemistry at the University of Leeds
Ted Lester, cricketer, for Yorkshire
 Harvey McGregor, Warden from 1985 to 1996 of New College, Oxford
 David McLintock, philologist and German translator
John Mollon, Professor of Visual Neuroscience since 1998 at the University of Cambridge
 Bill Nicholson OBE, football player and manager of Tottenham Hotspur, most notably managing the club to the Double in season 1960–61
Robert Palmer, singer & musician
 Harvey Proctor, Conservative MP from 1979 to 1983 for Basildon, and from 1983 to 1987 for Billericay
 Humphrey Razzall, Liberal Party (UK) Politician
 J. A. F. Rook, British chemist
Peter Taylor, writer and documentary maker
 Nick Thomas, founder of Qdos Entertainment
 Ian Wilmut OBE, embryologist, led the team responsible for cloning the sheep, Dolly, works at the University of Edinburgh
John Foster Wilson CBE (blinded at the age of 12 in a school chemistry experiment), went on to found the International Agency for the Prevention of Blindness
 Michael Wilson, former business editor for Sky News

Convent of Our Ladies of Mary High School for Girls
Note that the Graham School took over some of the buildings of the Scarborough Convent School but was not its successor
Susan Hill, author
Nadine Senior, founder of the Northern School of Contemporary Dance

Scarborough Girls' High School
 Elizabeth Bell (actress)
 Jane Harrison (GC), died in April 1968 on board BOAC Flight 712

Graham School Science College
Kriss Brining, Rugby league player, York and Salford
 Joy Brook, actress, most notably in The Bill and Peak Practice
 Michael Coulson, footballer, Scarborough & York City
 Craig Farrell (rugby league), many clubs including Hull FC and Hull Kingston Rovers
 Jonathon Fletcher, writer of JumpStation, the original internet search engine
 Paul Ingle, International Boxing Federation, featherweight world champion
Timothy Sheader, artistic director at Regent's Park Open Air Theatre
Billy Howle, actor, known for roles in Glue, Outlaw King, Star Wars: The Last Jedi and The Serpent

References

External links
 EduBase
 Old Scarborians 
 SGHS 

Secondary schools in North Yorkshire
Schools in Scarborough, North Yorkshire
Educational institutions established in 1973
1973 establishments in England
Academies in North Yorkshire